XRC may refer to:

 XML Resource, a user interface markup language used by wxWidgets
 Extended Remote Copy, a technology for data replication
 X-ray crystallography, a scientific technique for analysing molecular crystal structure using X-rays.